The Nigerian National Assembly delegation from Kaduna State comprises three Senators representing Kaduna North (Zone 1), Kaduna Central (Zone 2) and Kaduna South (Zone 3); and sixteen Representatives representing Giwa/Birnin Gwari, Igabi, Ikara/Kubau, Jaba/Zangon Kataf, Jema'a/Sanga, Kachia/Kagarko Kaduna North, Kaduna South, Kajuru/Chikun, Kaura, Kauru, Lere, Makarfi/Kudan, Sabon Gari, Soba, Zaria.

Fourth Republic

8th Assembly (2015-till date)

8th Assembly (2011-2015)

6th Assembly (2007–2011)

5th Assembly (2003–2007)

Third Republic

Second Republic

First Republic

References
Kaduna State delegation to the National Assembly of Nigeria

Kaduna State
National Assembly (Nigeria) delegations by state